Electoral district of Clifton Hill was an electoral district of the Legislative Assembly in the Australian state of Victoria. It centred on the north-eastern Melbourne suburb of Clifton Hill.

Members for Clifton Hill

Election results

References

Former electoral districts of Victoria (Australia)
1927 establishments in Australia
1955 disestablishments in Australia